Delovoy Peterburg (meaning St. Petersburg Business in English) is a Russian language daily business newspaper published in Saint Petersburg, Russia. The paper has been in circulation since 1993.

History and profile
Delovoy Peterburg was started in 1993. Its headquarters is in Saint Petersburg and the paper provides business- and finance-related news about the city and the region. The paper is published in tabloid format.

The owner of Delovoy Peterburg is Bonnier Group, and its publisher is Bonnier Business Press, ZAO, a subsidiary of the Bonnier Group. As of 2006 Andrey Ershov was the editor-in-chief. Maxim Vasjukov was appointed editor-in-chief on 8 December 2011.

In 2011 Delovoy Peterburg was awarded by WAN/IFRA in the editorial category for its news service, namely DPVkontakte, within a social media site.

In 2005 Delovoy Peterburg sold 23,000 copies. In 2010 the circulation of the daily rose to 24,000 copies. At the end of 2011 the paper had a circulation of 20,400 copies.

See also
 List of newspapers in Russia

References

External links
 Official website

1993 establishments in Russia
Business newspapers
Bonnier Group
Mass media in Saint Petersburg
Newspapers established in 1993
Russian-language newspapers published in Russia